Aedh mac Tairdelbach Ua Conchobair was King of Connacht briefly in 1342, and died in 1345.

References

 Byrne, Francis John (2001), Irish Kings and High-Kings, Dublin: Four Courts Press, 
 Gaelic and Gaelised Ireland, Kenneth Nicols, 1972.

Kings of Connacht
Year of birth missing
1345 deaths
People from County Roscommon
14th-century Irish monarchs
Aedh